The 1984 Basque regional election was held on Sunday, 26 February 1984, to elect the 2nd Parliament of the Basque Autonomous Community. All 75 seats in the Parliament were up for election.

The Basque Nationalist Party (EAJ/PNV) won 32 seats, the Socialist Party of the Basque Country (PSE–PSOE) came second with 19 seats, People's Unity (HB) came third with 11 seats, the People's Coalition (AP–PDP–UL) won 7 seats, and Basque Country Left (EE) won 6 seats.

Overview

Electoral system
The Basque Parliament was the devolved, unicameral legislature of the autonomous community of the Basque Country, having legislative power in regional matters as defined by the Spanish Constitution of 1978 and the regional Statute of Autonomy, as well as the ability to vote confidence in or withdraw it from a lehendakari.

Voting for the Parliament was on the basis of universal suffrage, which comprised all nationals over 18 years of age, registered in the Basque Country and in full enjoyment of their political rights. The 75 members of the Basque Parliament were elected using the D'Hondt method and a closed list proportional representation, with an electoral threshold of five percent of valid votes being applied in each constituency. Seats were allocated to constituencies, corresponding to the provinces of Álava, Biscay and Guipúzcoa, being allocated a fixed number of 25 seats each to provide for an equal representation of the three provinces in parliament as required under the regional statute of autonomy. This meant that Álava was allocated the same number of seats as Biscay and Gipuzkoa, despite their populations being, as of 1 January 1984: 264,410, 1,189,417 and 694,822, respectively.

The electoral law allowed for parties and federations registered in the interior ministry, coalitions and groupings of electors to present lists of candidates. Parties and federations intending to form a coalition ahead of an election were required to inform the relevant Electoral Commission within ten days of the election call, whereas groupings of electors needed to secure the signature of at least 500 electors in the constituencies for which they sought election, disallowing electors from signing for more than one list of candidates.

Election date
The term of the Basque Parliament expired four years after the date of its previous election, unless it was dissolved earlier. An election was required to take place within from thirty-six and forty-five days from the date of expiry of parliament. The previous election was held on 9 March 1980, which meant that the legislature's term would have expired on 9 March 1984. The election was required to be held no later than the forty-fifth day from dissolution, setting the latest possible election date for the Parliament on Monday, 23 April 1984.

After legal amendments in 1981, the lehendakari was granted the prerogative to dissolve the Basque Parliament at any given time and call a snap election, provided that no motion of no confidence was in process. In the event of an investiture process failing to elect a lehendakari within a sixty-day period from the Parliament re-assembly, the Parliament was to be dissolved and a fresh election called.

Opinion polls
The tables below lists opinion polling results in reverse chronological order, showing the most recent first and using the dates when the survey fieldwork was done, as opposed to the date of publication. Where the fieldwork dates are unknown, the date of publication is given instead. The highest percentage figure in each polling survey is displayed with its background shaded in the leading party's colour. If a tie ensues, this is applied to the figures with the highest percentages. The "Lead" column on the right shows the percentage-point difference between the parties with the highest percentages in a poll.

Voting intention estimates
The table below lists weighted voting intention estimates. Refusals are generally excluded from the party vote percentages, while question wording and the treatment of "don't know" responses and those not intending to vote may vary between polling organisations. When available, seat projections determined by the polling organisations are displayed below (or in place of) the percentages in a smaller font; 38 seats were required for an absolute majority in the Basque Parliament (31 until 11 December 1983).

Voting preferences
The table below lists raw, unweighted voting preferences.

Victory likelihood
The table below lists opinion polling on the perceived likelihood of victory for each party in the event of a regional election taking place.

Preferred Lehendakari
The table below lists opinion polling on leader preferences to become Lehendakari.

Results

Overall

Distribution by constituency

Aftermath

Notes

References
Opinion poll sources

Other

1984 in the Basque Country (autonomous community)
Basque Country
Regional elections in the Basque Country (autonomous community)
February 1984 events in Europe